Pedro Cordeiro (born 14 February 1963 in Porto, Portugal) is a former professional tennis player from Portugal and was the former captain of the Portugal Davis Cup and Fed Cup teams. He reached a career high singles ranking of 517 in November 1986.

References

External links 
 
 
 

1963 births
Living people
Portuguese male tennis players
Portuguese tennis coaches
Sportspeople from Porto